Lobocleta is a genus of moths in the family Geometridae erected by Warren in 1906.

Species
The genus includes the following species:

References

Sterrhini